William Hume may refer to:
Bill Hume (footballer) (1937–2005), English-born soccer player who played for New Zealand and Australia
Bill Hume (cartoonist) (1916–2009), American artist, art director, and newspaper man
Billy Hume (1935–1990), Scottish footballer
Willie Hume (1862–1941), cyclist, first ever winner on Dunlop pneumatic tyres
William Hume (Cape politician) (1837–1916), politician of the Cape Colony
William Errington Hume (1879–1960), English physician (knighted in 1952)
William H. Hume, American architect in New York City
William J. Hume, American heir, businessman and conservative philanthropist
William Fraser Hume (1867–1949), British geologist

See also
William Hume-Williams (1863–1947), British politician
William Hume Blake (1809–1870), Canadian jurist and politician
William Hume-Rothery (1899–1968), British metallurgist
William Hulme (disambiguation)